Mohammed Al-Khodaim (Arabic:محمد الخديم) (born 3 June 1989) is an Emirati footballer. He currently plays for Masafi as a midfielder.

References

External links
 

Emirati footballers
1989 births
Living people
Ajman Club players
Al-Ittihad Kalba SC players
Dibba FC players
Al-Taawon (UAE) Club players
Masafi Club players
UAE First Division League players
UAE Pro League players
Association football midfielders